Prison slang is an argot used primarily by criminals and detainees in correctional institutions. It is a form of anti-language. Many of the terms deal with criminal behavior, incarcerated life, legal cases, street life, and different types of inmates. Prison slang varies depending on institution, region, and country.  Prison slang can be found in other written forms such as diaries, letters, tattoos, ballads, songs, and poems. Prison slang has existed as long as there have been crime and prisons; in Charles Dickens' time it was known as "thieves' cant". Words from prison slang often eventually migrate into common usage, such as "snitch", "ducking", and "narc". Terms can also lose meaning or become obsolete such as "slammer" and "bull-derm."

Examples 
Prison slang, like other types of slang and dialects, varies by region. For that reason, the origins and the movement of prison slang across prisons  are of interest to many linguists and cultural anthropologists.

Some prison slang are quite old. For example, "to cart", meaning to transfer to another prison, has been in use in Glasgow since 1733.

A two-year study was done by Bert Little, Ph.D. on American English slang with the main focus being in the coastal plain region of  the Southeast U.S. His study published by The Trustees of Indiana University on behalf of the Anthropological Linguistics journal goes on to provide an extensive glossary of common prison slang terms that he found circling through the prison systems.  Studies by Alicja Dziedzic-Rawska from the Maria Curie-Skłodowska University in Poland describe prison slang as "extremely rich and creative" with new words being formed on a daily basis. These are mainly used as a means of security against unauthorized parties receiving a certain message and, in some cases, can be a way to ensure a prison inmate's survival within the cells.

Australia

Israel

United Kingdom

United States

Zimbabwe

See also
Gassing (prison slang)

References

External links

Prison Slang (US and UK)
http://psychrod.com/the-unique-dialect-of-prison-slang/

Slang
Slang